Zheleznodorozhny is an inhabited zone and former city in Moscow Oblast, Russia, located  east of Moscow. It was technically abolished and merged into the city of Balashikha in January 2015. Population:  Its name means "Railway", and its flag and coat of arms both had lines resembling railway tracks.

History
Founded in 1861 to service the railway station of Obiralovka, the settlement became famous as the location where the main character of Leo Tolstoy's 1878 novel Anna Karenina committed suicide. It was renamed Zheleznodorozhny (Russian for "by the railway") in 1939 and granted town status in 1952. In the 1960s the settlements of Kuchino, Savvino, Temnikovo, and Sergeyevka became part of Zheleznodorozhny. Kuchino is historically associated with the name of Andrei Bely, the Russian poet who lived there between 1925 and 1931.

In January 2015 Zheleznodorozhny was abolished and its territory merged into the city of Balashikha.

Administrative and municipal status
Within the framework of administrative divisions, it was incorporated as Zheleznodorozhny City Under Oblast Jurisdiction—an administrative unit with the status equal to that of the districts. As a municipal division, Zheleznodorozhny City Under Oblast Jurisdiction was incorporated as Zheleznodorozhny Urban Okrug.

Transportation
The railway connecting Moscow and Vladimir runs through Zheleznodorozhny, which is served by Kuchino and Zheleznodorozhnaya railway stations of the Gorkovsky suburban railway line.

Notable people
 Alexandra Snezhko-Blotskaya, animated films director, lived here until her death in 1980.
 Vasily Arkhipov, a Soviet Navy officer, lived in the city until his death in 1998.

References

Citations

Sources

External links

Zheleznodorozhny Business Directory 

2015 disestablishments in Russia
Populated places disestablished in 2015
Former populated places in Moscow Oblast
Renamed localities of Moscow Oblast